Miękinia  is a city in Środa Śląska County, Lower Silesian Voivodeship, in south-western Poland. It is the seat of the administrative district (gmina) called Gmina Miękinia.

The city has a population of 2078.

Miękinia is one of the places of winemaking in Poland.

Transport
The Voivodeship road 341 runs through Miękinia, connecting it with the National road 94, which runs nearby, south of the town. There is also a train station in Miękinia.

Sports
The local football club is Pogoń Miękinia. It competes in the lower leagues.

Notable people
 Robert Hermann Raudner (1854–1915), German landscape and genre painter, and etcher.

References

Środa Śląska County